Dalma Airport  is a small airport serving Dalma Island, United Arab Emirates. It is capable of handling small and medium size aircraft, most of which shuttle workers and visitors between the island and other cities.

Airlines and destinations

Accidents and incidents
On 15 May 1990, a twin engine Piper PA-31-310 Navajo aircraft following a cartography mission over the area crashed short of the runway on landing attempt. All four occupants were killed.

References

Airports in the United Arab Emirates